This is a list of television networks and television channels that are broadcast in the Chinese language or offer at least some programming in Chinese.

Mainland China

National networks 
 China Central Television (CCTV)
 CCTV-1 (General)
 CCTV-2 (Finance)
 CCTV-3 (Arts)
 CCTV-4 (International Chinese)
 Asia Channel
 Europe Channel
 America Channel
 CCTV-5 (Sports)
 CCTV-6 (Movies)
 CCTV-7 (Military)
 CCTV-8 (Drama)
 CCTV-9 (Documentary)
 CCTV-10 (Science & Education)
 CCTV-11 (Opera)
 CCTV-12 (Law & Society)
 CCTV-13 (News)
 CCTV-14 (Children)
 CCTV-15 (Music)
 CCTV-16 (Olympic Channel)
 CCTV-17 (Agriculture and Rural)
 CCTV-5+ (Sport Plus)
 China Education Television (CETV)
 CETV-1 (Human resources)
 CETV-2 (Distance education)
 CETV-3 (Humanities)
 CETV-4 (Classroom)
 CETV-5 (Early Education)
 China Xinhua News Network Corporation (CNC)
 CNC World
 CNC Finance and Business
China Weather TV
China Movie TV(CHC)
China Health TV

Digital television networks
 CHC Television 华诚
 TOPV 鼎视频道
 JXTVS 吉祥购物
 China Food Television (CFTV) 中华美食频道
 NewsFlash 新动漫
 WinTV 天盛欧洲足球频道
 China Film Channel 中国电影频道
 Weather Channel 气象频道
 VAN Television 先锋乒羽

Cable networks
 MTV Mandarin
 Huaxia Television 华夏电视台
 Discovery Travel & Living Asia 亚洲旅游台
 Discovery Channel
 Celestial Movies 天映电影频道
 National Geographic Channel (NGC) 国家地理频道
 AXN 索尼动作频道
 Beijing TV
 Goal TV
 TrueVisions UBC泰星
 HBO
 Star Sports 卫视体育台
 Hunan TV
 ESPN
 Channel V
 Channel NewsAsia (CNA) 新加坡亚洲新

Provincial and prefectural networks

Anhui
 Anhui Television (AHTV) 安徽电视台
 Anhui Satellite Channel
 Anhui TV Science and Education Channel
 Anhui TV Economic Channel
 Anhui TV Television Channel
 Anhui TV Sports Channel
 Anhui TV Public Channel
 Hefei Television (HFTV) 合肥电视台
 Hefei TV News Channel
 Hefei TV Live Channel
 Hefei TV Legal Channel
 Hefei TV Finance Channel
 Hefei TV HBO Channel
 Hefei TV Feixi Channel
 Hefei TV Feidong Channel
 Hefei TV Long Fengtai Channel
 Hefei TV Theater Channel
 Bengbu Television (AHBTV) 蚌埠电视台
 Bengbu TV-1
 Bengbu TV-2
 Bengbu TV-3
 Huainan Television (HNGD) 淮南电视台
 Huainan TV-1
 Huainan TV-2
 Huainan TV-3
Suzhou Television(AHSZTV)宿州电视台
Suzhou TV-1
Suzhou TV-2
Suzhou TV-3

Beijing
 Beijing Television (BTV) 北京电视台
 BTV Beijing Channel
 BTV Satellite Channel
 BTV Arts Channel
 BTV Science and Education Channel
 BTV Entertainment Channel
 BTV Finance Channel
 BTV Sports Channel
 BTV Lifestyle Channel
 BTV Youth Channel
 BTV Public Channel
 Kaku - Cartoons
 China Central Television Pay Vision 央视风云
 CCTV Film Channel
 CCTV Fengyun Music Channel
 CCTV Prime Theatre Channel
 CCTV Football Channel
 CCTV Golf and Tennis Channel
 CCTV FY Theatre Channel
 CCTV World Geographic Channel
 CCTV Nostalgia Theatre Channel
 CCTV Quality Channel
 CCTV Entertainment Channel
 CCTV Opera Channel
 CCTV Defense Military Channel
 CCTV Women Fashion Channel

Chongqing
 Chongqing Broadcasting Group (CBG) 重庆电视台
 Chongqing Satellite Channel
 Chongqing TV Drama Channel
 Chongqing TV News Channel
 Chongqing TV science Channel
 Chongqing TV City Channel
 Chongqing TV Entertainment Channel
 Chongqing TV Life Channel
 Chongqing TV Fashion Channel
 Chongqing TV Public Channel
 Chongqing TV Youth Channel

Fujian
 Fujian Media Group (FMG) 福建电视台
 Fujian TV Southeast Satellite Channel
 Fujian Satellite Channel
 Fujian TV Drama Channel
 Fujian TV Integrated Channel
 Fujian TV Public Channel
 Fujian TV News Channel
 Fujian TV Fashion Channel
 Fujian TV Economic Channel
 Fujian TV Sports Channel
 Fujian TV Children Channel
 Fujian TV Education Channel
 Xiamen Media Group (XMG) 厦门电视台
 Xiamen TV Star Channel
 Xiamen TV News Channel
 Xiamen TV Drama Channel
 Xiamen TV Live Channel
 Xiamen TV Movie Channel
 Fuzhou Television (FZTV) 福州电视台
 Fuzhou TV Comprehensive Channel
 Fuzhou TV Movie Channel
 Fuzhou TV Live Channel
 Quanzhou Television (QZTV) 泉州电视台
 Quanzhou TV Comprehensive Channel
 Quanzhou TV City Channel
 Quanzhou TV Movie Channel
 Quanzhou Hokkien Channel
 Zhangzhou Television (ZZTV) 漳州电视台
 Zhangzhou TV-1
 Zhangzhou TV2
 Longyan Television (LYTV) 龙岩电视台
 Putian Television (PTBTV) 莆田电视台
 Nanping Television (NPTV) 南平电视台
 Sanming Television (SMGD) 三明电视台

Gansu
 Gansu Television (GSTV) 甘肃电视台
 Gansu Satellite Channel
 Gansu TV Economic Channel
 Gansu TV Children Channel
 Gansu TV Public Channel
 Gansu TV City Channel
 Gansu TV Cultural Television Channel
 Lanzhou Television (LZTV) 兰州电视台
 Lanzhou TV News Comprehensive Channel
 Lanzhou TV Sports and Variety Channel
 Lanzhou TV Economic Channel
 Lanzhou TV Public Channel
 Tianshui Television (TSTV) 天水电视台
 Tianshui TV News Comprehensive Channel
 Tianshui TV public Channel
 Jinchang Television (JCTV) 金昌电视台
 Jinchang TV Public Channel
 Jinchang TV Comprehensive Channel

Guangdong
 Southern Media Corporation (SMC) 南方广播影视传媒集团
 Guangdong Television (GDTV) 广东电视台
 Guangdong Satellite Channel
 Guangdong TV Pearl River Channel
Chinese Channel
 International Channel
 Guangdong TV Sports Channel
 Guangdong TV Public Channel
 Guangdong TV News Channel
 Jia Jia Cartoon Channel
 Southern Television (TVS) 南方电视台
 TVS Economic Channel
 TVS Star Channel
 TVS Arts Channel
 TVS Drama Channel
 TVS Children Channel
 Guangzhou Broadcasting Network (GZBN) 广州市广播电视台
 Guangzhou Television Channel
 Guangzhou News Channel
 Guangzhou Lottery Channel
 Guangzhou Drama Channel
 Guangzhou Life Channel
 Guangzhou Economic Channel
 Guangzhou Children Channel
 Guangzhou Shopping Channel
 Guangzhou Mobile Channel
 Shenzhen Media Group (SZMG) 深圳电视台
 Shenzhen Satellite Channel
 Shenzhen TV City Channel
 Shenzhen TV Drama Channel
 Shenzhen TV Financial Channel
 Shenzhen TV Entertainment Channel
 Shenzhen TV Sport Health Channel
 Shenzhen TV Children Channel
 Shenzhen TV Public Channel
 Shenzhen TV Legal Channel
 Shenzhen TV Longgang Channel
 Shenzhen TV Eastern Channel
 Shenzhen TV Baoan Channel
 Shenzhen TV Western Channel
 Zhongshan Television (ZSTV) 中山电视台
 Zhongshan TV Comprehensive Channel
 Zhongshan TV Public Channel
 Shantou Television (STRTV) 汕头电视台
 Shantou TV Economic Channel
 Shantou TV News Comprehensive Channel
 Shantou TV Film and Drama Channel
 Meizhou Television (GDMZTV) 梅州电视台
 Meizhou TV News Channel
 Meizhou TV Public Channel
 Meizhou TV Film and Drama Channel
 Huizhou Television (HZCATV) 惠州电视台
 Huizhou TV-1
 Huizhou TV-2
 Huizhou TV-3
 Dongguan Television (DGTV) 东莞电视台
 Dongguan TV News Channel
 Dongguan TV Public Channel
 Foshan Television (FSTV) 佛山电视台
 Foshan TVComprehensive Channel
 Foshan TV Drama Channel
 Foshan TV Public Channel
 Foshan TV Nanhai Channel
 Foshan TV Shunde Channel
 Zhanjian Televisiong (ZJJS) 湛江电视台
 Zhanjian TV News Channel
 Zhanjian TV Public Channel
 Chaozhou Television (CZBTV) 潮州电视台
 Chaozhou TV News Channel
 Chaozhou TV Public Channel
 Zhuhai Television (ZHTV) 珠海电视台
 Zhuhai TV-1
 Zhuhai TV-2
 Jieyang Television (JYTV) 揭阳电视台
 Jieyang TV News Channel
 Jieyang TV Public Channel
 Maoming Television (MMGSW) 茂名电视台
 Maoming TV Public Channel
 Maoming TV Comprehensive Channel
 Jiangmen Television (JMTV) 江门电视台
 Jiangmen Television Channel
 Zhaoqing Television (ZQTV) 肇庆电视台
 Zhaoqing TV News Channel
 Zhaoqing TV Public Channel

Guangxi
 Guangxi Television (GXTV) 广西电视台
 Guangxi Satellite Channel
 Guangxi TV Arts Channel
 Guangxi TV City Channel
 Guangxi TV Public Channel
 Guangxi TV Movie Channel
 Guangxi TV Sport channel
 Guangxi TV News Channel
 Liuzhou Television (LZGD) 柳州电视台
 Liuzhou TV News Comprehensive Channel
 Liuzhou TV Life Science Channel
 Liuzhou TV Public and Movie Channel
 Nanning Television (NNTV) 南宁电视台
 Nanning TV Integrated News Channel
 Nanning TV Entertainment Channel
 Nanning TV City Life Channel
 Nanning TV Public Channel
 Yulin Television (YLTVB) 玉林电视台
 Yulin TV News Comprehensive Channel
 Yulin TV Public Channel
 Yulin TV Knowledge Channel
 Wuzhou Television (GXWZTV) 梧州电视台
 Wuzhou TV Composite News Channel
 Wuzhou TV Movie Channel
 Wuzhou TV Education Channel

Guizhou
 Guizhou Television (GZSTV) 贵州电视台
 Guizhou Satellite Channel
 Guizhou TV Public Channel
 Guizhou TV Drama Channel
 Guizhou TV Public Movie channel
 Guizhou TV Lifestyle Channel
 Guizhou TV Science, Education, and Health Channel
 Guizhou TV Tianyuan Go Channel
 Guizhou TV Photography Channel
 Guizhou TV Economic Channel
 Guiyang Television (GYTV) 贵阳电视台
 Guiyang TV Integrated News Channel
 Guiyang TV Economic Channel
 Guiyang TV City Channel
 Guiyang TV Legal Channel
 Guiyang TV Travel and Living Channel
 Anshun Television (ASTV) 安顺电视台
 Anshun TV News Channel
 Anshun TV Movie Channel

Hainan
 The Travel Channel (TCTC) 旅游卫视
 Hainan Television (HNWTV) 海南电视台
 Hainan TV Children Channel
 Hainan TV Public Channel
 Hainan TV Entertainment Channel
 Hainan TV Comprehensive Channel
 Haikou Television (HKTV) 海口电视台
 Haikou TV Comprehensive News Channel
 Haikou TV Live Entertainment Channel
 Haikou TV Economic Channel

Hebei
 Hebei Television (HEBTV) 河北电视台
 Hebei Satellite Channel
 Hebei TV Economic Life Channel
 Hebei TV City Channel
 Hebei TV Movie Channel
 Hebei TV Children Science and Education Channel
 Hebei TV Public Channel
 Hebei TV Farmers Channel
 Qinhuangdao Television (QHDRTV) 秦皇岛电视台
 Qinhuangdao TV News Channel
 Qinhuangdao TV Political Channel
 Qinhuangdao TV Movie Channel
 Baoding Television (BDTV) 保定电视台
 Baoding TV Integrated News Channel
 Baoding TV City Channel
 Baoding TV Health Channel
 Handan Television (DHZC) 邯郸电视台
 Handan TV-1
 Handan TV-2
 Handan TV-3
 Chengde Television (CDDTV) 承德电视台
 Chengde TV Comprehensive News Channel
 Chengde TV City Channel
 Chengde TV Film and Television Channel
 Hengshu Televisioni (HSTV) 衡水电视台
 Hengshui TV Public Channel
 Hengshui TV Comprehensive News Channel
 Langfang Television (LFTV) 廊坊电视台
 Langfang TV News Channel
 Langfang TV City Channel
 Langfang TV Public Film Channel
 Xingtai Television (XTTV) 邢台电视台
 Xingtai TV Integrated News Channel
 Xingtai TV Live Entertainment Channel
 Xingtai TV Movie Channel
 Shijiazhuang Television (SJZTV) 石家庄电视台
 Shijiazhuang Satellite Channel
 Shijiazhuang TV Integrated News channel
 Shijiazhuang TV Movie Channel
 Shijiazhuang TV City Channel
 Cangzhou Television (CZTV) 沧州电视台
 Cangzhou TV Comprehensive News Channel
 Cangzhou TV Entertainment Channel
 Cangzhou TV Public Channel

Heilongjiang
 Heilongjiang Television (HLJTV) 黑龙江电视台
 Heilongjiang Satellite Channel
 Heilongjiang TV Movie Channel
 Heilongjiang TV Arts Channel
 Heilongjiang TV City Channel
 Heilongjiang TV Legal Channel
 Heilongjiang TV Public Channel
 Heilongjiang TV Children Channel
 Harbin Television (HRBTV) 哈尔滨电视台
 Harbin TV Composite News Channel
 Harbin TV City Information Channel
 Harbin TV Live Channel
 Harbin TV Entertainment Channel
 Harbin TV Movie Channel
 Qiqihar Television (QQHRGD) 齐齐哈尔电视台
 Qiqihar TV News Channel
 Qiqihar TV Movie Channel
 Qiqihar TV City Channel
 Qiqihar TV Science Education Channel
 Daqing Television (BHW) 大庆电视台
 Daqing TV Comprehensive Channel
 Daqing TV Movie Channel
 Daqing TV 100 Lake Channel
 Daqing TV Science and Education Channel
 Daqing TV Oil Field Channel
 Yichun Television (YCHTV) 伊春电视台
 Yichun TV Comprehensive Channel
 Yichun TV Public Channel
 Mudanjiang Television (MDJTV) 牡丹江电视台
 Mudanjiang TV Comprehensive News Channel
 Mudanjiang TV Public Channel
 Mudanjiang TV Education Channel
 Jiamusi Television (JMSTV) 佳木斯电视台
 Jiamusi TV Composite News Channel
 Jiamusi TV Public Channel
 Jiamusi TV Movie Channel
 Hegang Television (HGTV) 鹤岗电视台
 Hegang TV Comprehensive News Channel
 Hegang TV Public Channel
 Hegang TV Mining Channel

Henan
 Henan Television (HNTV) 河南电视台
 Henan Satellite Channel
 Henan City Channel
 Henan Economic Channel
 Henan Law Channel
 Henan Drama Channel
 Henan Exposition Channel
 Henan Info Channel
 Henan Public Channel
 Henan Rural News Channel
 Luohe Television (LHTV) 漯河电视台
 Luohe Living Channel
 Luohe City Channel
 Luohe Drama Channel
 Sanmenxia Television (SMXTV) 三门峡电视台
 Sanmenxia Television Channel
 Sanmenxia Public Channel
 Jiaozuo Television (JZRT) 焦作电视台
 Jiaozuo Television 1
 Jiaozuo Television 2
 Jiaozuo Television 3
 Kaifeng Television (KFTV) 开封电视台
 Kaifeng Television Channel
 Kaifeng Education Channel
 Zhumadian Television (ZMDTVW) 驻马店电视台
 Zhumadian Television Channel
 Zhumadian Financial Channel
 Puyang Television (PYTV) 濮阳电视台
 Puyang Television 1
 Puyang Television 2
 Puyang Television 3
 Zhongyuan Petroleum Channel
 Xuchang Television (XCTV) 许昌电视台
 Xuchang Comprehensive News Channel
 Xuchang Public Channel
 Zhoukou Television (HNZKTV) 周口电视台
 Zhoukou Comprehensive News Channel
 Zhoukou Financial Channel
 Zhoukou Drama Channel
 Zhoukou Info Channel
 Pingdingshan Television (PDSTV) 平顶山电视台
 Pingdingshan Comprehensive News Channel
 Pingdingshan City Channel
 Pingdingshan Public Channel
 Pingdingshan Education Channel
 Xinyang Television (XYTV) 信阳电视台
 Xinyang Television Channel
 Xinyang Pingqiao Channel
 Xinyang Public Channel
 Hebi Television (HEBITV) 鹤壁电视台
 Hebi Television Channel
 Hebi Drama Channel
 Xinxiang Television (XXHTV) 新乡电视台
 Xinxiang Comprehensive News Channel
 Xinxiang Entertainment Channel
 Xinxiang Law Channel
 Xinxiang Lifestyle Channel
 Xinxiang Education Channel
 Anyang Television (AYTV) 安阳电视台
 Anyang City Channel
 Anyang Comprehensive News Channel
 Anyang Science Channel
 Anyang Drama Channel
 Nanyang Television (NYTV) 南阳电视台
 Nanyang Comprehensive News Channel
 Nanyang Lifestyle Channel
 Nanyang Art Channel
 Luoyang Television (LYTV) 洛阳电视台
 Luoyang Comprehensive News Channel
 Luoyang Economic Channel
 Luoyang Science Channel
 Luoyang Drama Channel
 Zhengzhou Television (ZZTV) 郑州电视台
 Zhengzhou Television 1
 Zhengzhou Television 2
 Zhengzhou Television 3
 Zhengzhou Television 4
 Zhengzhou Television 5
 Zhengzhou Television 6
 Zhengzhou Education Channel
 Shangqiu Television (SQTV) 商丘电视台
 Shangqiu Comprehensive News Channel
 Shangqiu Public Channel
 Shangqiu Science Channel

Hubei
 Hubei Television (HBTV) 湖北电视台
 Hubei Television Channel
 Hubei Comprehensive News Channel
 Hubei Movie Channel
 Hubei Education Channel
 Hubei Sports Channel
 Hubei City Channel
 Hubei Public Channel
 Hubei Law Network
 Wuhan Television (WHTV) 武汉电视台
 Wuhan Television 1
 Wuhan Television 2
 Wuhan Television 3
 Wuhan Television 4
 Wuhan Television 5
 Wuhan Television 6
 Wuhan Television 7
 Wuhan Consumer Guide Channel
 Wuhan Education Channel
 Jingzhou Television (JZTV) 荆州电视台
 Jingzhou News Channel
 Jingzhou Wonderful Life Channel
 Jingzhou Entertainment Channel
 Xiangyang Television (XYRTV) 襄阳电视台
 Xiangyang Comprehensive News Channel
 Xiangyang Finance and Life Channel
 Xiangyang Public Channel
 Yichang Sanxia (YCSXTV) 宜昌三峡电视台
 Yichang News Channel
 Yichang Public Channel
 Yichang Movie Channel
 Shiyan Television (SYRTV) 十堰电视台
 Shiyan News Channel
 Shiyan Comprehensive News Channel
 Shiyan Finance Channel
 Shiyan Info Channel
 Jingmen Television (HBJMTV) 荆门电视台
 Jingmen Public Channel
 Jingmen News Channel
 Jingmen Education Channel
 Huanggang Television (HBHGTV) 黄冈电视台
 Huanggang News Channel
 Huanggang Public Channel

Hunan
 Hunan Broadcasting System (Golden Eagle Broadcasting System) (HBS)湖南广播电视台 
 Hunan Television (HTV) 湖南卫视
 Hunan Satellite Channel
 Hunan Golden Eagle Cartoon Channel
 Hunan Entertainment Channel
 Hunan Movie Channel
 Hunan Public Channel
 Xiaoxiang Movie Channel
 Hunan Education Channel
 Hunan Economic Television (HNETV) 湖南经济电视台
 Hunan Economic Finance Channel
 Hunan Economic City Channel
 Hunan Economic Lifestyle Channel
 Changsha Television (HNCSTV) 长沙电视台
 Changsha Television Channel
 Changsha Politic Channel
 Changsha Economic and Trade Channel
 Changsha News Channel
 Changsha Public Channel
 Changde Television (HNCDTV) 常德电视台
 Changde News Channel
 Changde Public Channel
 Changde City Channel
 Dingdu Television Channel
 Xiangtan Television (XTRTU) 湘潭电视台
 Xiangtan City Channel
 Xiangtan Law Channel
 Xiangtan News Channel
 Hengyang Television (HYDST) 衡阳电视台
 Hengyang Television Channel
 Yueyang Television (YYTV) 岳阳电视台
 Yueyang News Channel
 Yueyang Public Channel
 Yueyang Science Channel
 Zhuzhou Television (HNZZTV) 株洲电视台
 Zhuzhou Comprehensive News Channel
 Zhuzhou Law Channel
 Zhuzhou Public Channel

Inner Mongolia
 Inner Mongolia Television (NMTV) 内蒙古电视台
 Inner Mongolia Satellite Channel
 Inner Mongolia Comprehensive News Channel
 Inner Mongolia Economic Channel
 Inner Mongolia Sports and Entertainment Channel
 Inner Mongolia Movie Channel
 Inner Mongolia Children Channel
 Inner Mongolia Drama Channel
 Hohhot Television (HTVCN) 呼和浩特电视台
 Hohhot News Channel
 Hohhot City Channel
 Hohhot Movie Channel

Jiangsu
 Jiangsu Broadcasting Corporation (JSBC) 江苏电视台
 Jiangsu Satellite Channel
 Jiangsu City Channel
 Jiangsu Arts Channel
 Jiangsu Movie Channel
 Jiangsu Public Channel
 Jiangsu Sports Channel
 Jiangsu Children's Channel
 Jiangsu Fashion Channel
 Jiangsu Education Channel
 Jiangsu International Channel
 Jiangyin Television (JSJYTV) 江阴电视台
 Jiangyin Comprehensive News Channel
 Jiangyin City Channel
 Jiangyin Movie Channel
 Jiangyin Drama Channel
 Taizhou Television (TZTV) 泰州电视台
 Taizhou Entertainment Channel
 Taizhou Economic Channel
 Taizhou Comprehensive News Channel
 Taizhou Education Channel
 Nantong Television (NTTV) 南通电视台
 Nantong Television 1
 Nantong Television 2
 Nantong Television 3
 Nantong Television 4
 Changzhou Television (CZCATC) 常州电视台
 Changzhou News Channel
 Changzhou City Channel
 Changzhou Movie Channel
 Changzhou Public and Art Channel
 Changzhou Documentary Channel
 Xuzhou Television (XZGD) 徐州电视台
 Xuzhou Comprehensive News Channel
 Xuzhou Economic Channel
 Xuzhou Art Channel
 Xuzhou Social Politics Channel
 Wuxi Television (WXETV) 无锡电视台
 Wuxi Comprehensive News Channel
 Wuxi Entertainment Channel
 Wuxi Economic Channel
 Wuxi City Channel
 Wuxi Health Channel
 Wuxi Movie Channel
 Wuxi Education Channel
 Wuxi Sports Channel
 Suzhou Television (CSZTV) 苏州电视台
 Suzhou Comprehensive News Channel
 Suzhou Socio-Economic Channel
 Suzhou Cultural Channel
 Suzhou Movie and Entertainment Channel
 Suzhou Lifestyle Channel
 Nanjing Broadcasting Group (NJBG) 南京电视台
 Nanjing Comprehensive News Channel
 Nanjing Education and Technology Channel
 Nanjing Drama Channel
 Nanjing Children's Channel
 Nanjing Lifestyle Channel
 Channe 18 Nanjing
 Nanjing Entertainment Channel
 Nanjing Info Channel
 Changshu Television (CSTV) 常熟电视台
 Changshu Comprehensive News Channel
 Changshu Social Life Channel
 Changshu Entertainment Channel

Jiangxi
 Jiangxi Television (JXTV) 江西电视台
 Jiangxi Satellite Channel
 Jiangxi Television 2
 Jiangxi Television 3
 Jiangxi Television 4
 Jiangxi Television 5
 Jiangxi Television 6
 Jiangxi Television Guide Channel
 Shangrao Television (SRRTV) 上饶电视台
 Shangrao Television 1
 Shangrao Television 2
 Fuzhou Television (JXFZTV) 抚州电视台
 Fuzhou Comprehensive Channel
 Fuzhou Public Channel
 Yingtan Television (JXFZTV) 鹰潭电视台
 Yingtan Comprehensive News Channel
 Yingtan Public Channel
 Xinyu Television (JXXYTV) 新余电视台
 Xinyu Television 1
 Xinyu Television 2
 Jiujiang Television (JJTV) 九江电视台
 Jiujiang Television 1
 Jiujiang Public Channel
 Jiujiang Television 3
 Jiujiang Travel Channel
 Pingxiang Television (PXTV) 萍乡电视台
 Pingxiang Comprehensive News Channel
 Pingxiang City Channel
 Pingxiang Educational Channel
 Ganzhou Television (JXGZTV) 赣州电视台
 Ganzhou Television 1
 Ganzhou Television 2
 Ganzhou Television 3
 Nanchang Television (NCTV) 南昌电视台
 Nanchang Television 1
 Nanchang Television 2
 Nanchang Television 3
 Nanchang Television 4
 Jiangxi Educational Television (JXETV) 江西教育电视台
 Jiangxi Educational Channel
 Yichun Television (JXYCTV) 宜春电视台
 Yichun Television 1
 Yichun Television 2
 Yichun Television 3

Jilin
 Jilin Television (JLTV) 吉林电视台
 Jilin Satellite Channel
 Jilin Television City Channel
 Jilin Lifestyle Channel
 Jilin Movie Channel
 Jilin Rural Channel
 Jilin Public Channel
 Jilin Law Channel
 Changchun Television (CCJLTV) 长春电视台
 Changchun Television 1
 Changchun Television 2
 Changchun Television 3
 Changchun Television 4
 Changchun Television 5
 Jilin Educational Television (JLETV) 吉林教育电视台
 Jilin Educational Channel
 Jilin City Television (JLCATV) 吉林市电视台
 Jilin City News Channel
 Jilin City City Channel
 Jilin City Entertainment Channel
 Jilin City Drama Channel
 Jilin City Public Channel
 Yanbian Television (YBTV) 延边卫视
 Yanbian Television Channel
 Songyuan Television (SYTV) 松原电视台
 Songyuan News Channel
 Songyuan Economic Channel
 Songyuan Children's Channel

Liaoning
 Liaoning Television (LNTV) 辽宁电视台
 Liaoning Satellite Channel
 Liaoning City Channel
 Shenyang Television (SYTV) 沈阳电视台
 Shenyang News Channel
 Liaoning Television and Shenyang Television
 Liaoning Economic Channel
 Liaoning Movie and TV Series Channel
 Liaoning Easy Go Tele-Shopping Channel
 Liaoning Educational And Youth Channel
 Liaoning Lifestyle Channel
 Liaoning Sport Channel
 Liaoning Public Channel
 Liaoning North Channel
 Jinzhou Television (JZCATV) 锦州电视台
 Jinzhou Television 1
 Jinzhou Television 2
 Jinzhou Television 3
 Jinzhou Television 4
 Tieling Television (TLTV) 铁岭电视台
 Tieling Comprehensive News Channel
 Tieling Lifestyle Channel
 Tieling Public Channel
 Benxi Television (BXTV) 本溪电视台
 Benxi Television 1
 Benxi Television 2
 Benxi Television 3
 Dandong Television (DDTV) 丹东电视台
 Dandong Television 1
 Dandong Television 2
 Dandong Television 3
 Fushun Television (LNFSTV) 抚顺电视台
 Fushun News Channel
 Fushun Public Channel
 Fushun Education Channel
 Dalian Television (DLTV) 大连电视台
 Dalian Comprehensive News Channel
 Dalian Lifestyle Channel
 Dalian Law Channel
 Dalian Sports Channel
 Dalian TV series Channel
 Dalian Children's Channel
 Dalian Business Channel
 Liaoyang Television (LYTV) 辽阳电视台
 Liaoyang Comprehensive News Channel
 Liaoyang Public Channel
 Liaoyang Educational and Technology Channel
 Anshan Television (ASTV) 鞍山电视台
 Anshan Comprehensive News Channel
 Anshan Lifestyle Channel
 Anshan Entertainment Channel
 Anshan Fashion Channel
 Anshan City Channel
 Anshan News Service Channel

Ningxia
 Ningxia Television (NXTV) 宁夏电视台
 Ningxia Satellite Channel
 Ningxia Public Channel
 Ningxia Urban Economic Channel
 Ningxia Movie Channel
 Ningxia Children's Channel
 Ningxia Video-on-demand
 Ningxia Home Theater Channel
 Yinchuan Television (NXYCTV) 银川电视台
 Yinchuan Sports Channel
 Yinchuan Lifestyle Channel
 Yinchuan Public Channel
 Guyuan Television (GYTV) 固原电视台
 Guyuan Television Channel
 Wuzhong Television (NXWZTV) 吴忠电视台
 Wuzhong Television Channel
 Shizuishan Television (SZSTV) 石嘴山电视台
 Shizuishan Television Channel
 Zhongwei Television (ZWTV) 中卫电视台
 Zhongwei Television Channel

Qinghai
 Qinghai Television (QHTV) 青海电视台
 Qinghai Satellite Channel
 Qinghai Economic Channel
 Qinghai Arts Channel
 Qinghai Comprehensive News Channel
 Qinghai Cable Channel
 Xining Television (XNTV) 西宁电视台
 Xining Comprehensive News Channel
 Xining Entertainment Channel

Shaanxi
 Shaanxi Television (SAXTV) 陕西电视台
 Shaanxi Television 1
 Shaanxi Television 2
 Shaanxi Television 3
 Shaanxi Television 4
 Shaanxi Television 5
 Shaanxi Television 6
 Shaanxi Television 7
 Xi'an Television (XATV) 西安电视台
 Xi'an City Channel
 Xi'an Comprehensive News Channel
 Xi'an Business News Channel
 Xi'an Cultural Channel
 Xi'an Health Channel
 Xi'an Music and Arts Channel
 Ankang Television (AKTV) 安康电视台
 Ankang Television Channel

Shandong
 Shandong Television (SDTV) 山东电视台
 Shandong Satellite Channel
 Shandong Qilu Channel
 Shandong Sports Channel
 Shandong Agricultural Science Channel
 Shandong Public Channel
 Shandong Arts Channel
 Shandong Movie Channel
 Shandong Lifestyle Channel
 Shandong Television 9
 Heze Television (HZTV) 菏泽电视台
 Heze Television 1
 Heze Television 2
 Heze Television 3
 Dezhou Television (DZTV) 德州电视台
 Dezhou Comprehensive News Channel
 Dezhou Documentary Channel
 Dezhou Movie Channel
 Weihai Television (SDWHTV) 威海电视台
 Weihai Television 1
 Weihai Television 2
 Weihai Television 3
 Liaocheng Television (LCTV) 聊城电视台
 Liaocheng Watertown Channel
 Liaocheng Economic Channel
 Liaocheng Public Channel
 Liaocheng Comprehensive News Channel
 Liaocheng Lifestyle Channel
 Tai'an Television (TATV) 泰安电视台
 Tai'an Television 1
 Tai'an Television 2
 Tai'an Television 3
 Tai'an Television 4
 Tai'an Drama Channel
 Jining Television (SDJNTV) 济宁电视台
 Jining Television 1
 Jining Television 2
 Jining Public Channel
 Shandong Public Rural Channel
 Shandong Public Urban Channel
 Jining Central Channel
 Jining Central Documentary Channel
 Binzhou Television (BZTV) 滨州电视台
 Binzhou Television 1
 Binzhou Cable Channel
 Binzhou Public Channel
 Binzhou Art Channel
 Rizhao Television (RZTV) 日照电视台
 Rizhao Comprehensive News Channel
 Rizhao Science Channel
 Rizhao Public Channel
 Rizhao Movie Channel
 Shengli Youtian Television (SLYTTV) 胜利油田电视台
 Shengli Youtian Television 1
 Shengli Youtian Television 2
 Shengli Youtian Television 3
 Dongying Television (DYTV) 东营电视台
 Dongying Television 1
 Dongying Television 2
 Dongying Television 3
 Dongying Education Channel
 Linyi Television (LYTV) 临沂电视台
 Linyi Public Channel
 Linyi News Channel
 Linyi Agricultural Channel
 Linyi Television Guide Channel
 Weifang Television (WFTV) 潍坊电视台
 Weifang News Channel
 Weifang Public Channel
 Weifang Economic Channel
 Weifang Science and Education Channel
 Weifang Weicheng Cable Channel
 Zibo Television (ZBTV) 淄博电视台
 Zibo Comprehensive News Channel
 Zibo Movie Channel
 Zibo Lifestyle Channel
 Zibo City Channel
 Zibo Science Channel
 Zhangdian Channel
 Shandong Education Television (SDETV) 山东教育电视台
 Shandong Educational Channel
 Yantai Television (YTTV) 烟台电视台
 Yantai News Channel
 Yantai Economic Channel
 Yantai Drama Channel
 Yantai City Style Channel
 Yantai Movie Channel
 Qingdao Television (QDTV) 青岛电视台
 Qingdao Comprehensive News Channel
 Qingdao Science Channel
 Qingdao Movie Channel
 Qingdao Financial News Channel
 Qingdao City Channel
 Qingdao Public Channel
 Jinan Television (JNTV) 济南电视台
 Jinan Comprehensive News Channel
 Jinan Women Channel
 Jinan Movie Channel
 Jinan Lifestyle Channel
 Jinan Children's Channel
 Jinan Business Channel
 Jinan Entertainment Channel
 Jinan Education Channel
 Zaozhuang Television (SDZZTV) 枣庄电视台
 Zaozhuang Education Channel
 Zaozhuang Public Channel
 Zaozhuang News Channel

Shanghai
 Shanghai Media Group (SMG) 上海广播电视台
 SMG News Channel
 SMG Entertainment Channel
 Dragon Television Channel
 Dragon Movie Channel
 SMG China Business Network
 SMG Channel of Fine Arts
 SMG Sports Channel
 SMG International Channel Shanghai
 SMG OCJ Channel
 Haha Television Channel
 SMG Drama Channel
 SMG Documentary Channel
 Toonmax Television Channel
 Shanghai Educational Television (SETV) 上海教育电视台
 Shanghai Educational Channel
 Shanghai Interactive Television (SiTV) 文广数字电视
 SiTV Premiere Drama
 SiTV City Play
 SiTV Platinum Drama
 SiTV Channel Enjoy
 SiTV Classical Drama
 SiTV Game
 SiTV Cartoon
 SiTV Health
 SiTV Documentary (News Real)
 SiTV Entrainment Front
 SiTV Law Life
 SiTV Colourful Stage
 SiTV Channel Elen
 SiTV Learning
 SiTV Golden Life
 SiTV Channel Max
 SiTV Channel Lucky
 SiTV Chinese Drama
 SiTV Foreign Drama
 SiTV Emotional Drama
 SiTV Action Drama
 SiTV Nostalgic
 SiTV VOD Drama
 SiTV Best Selected
 SiTV Great Sports
 SiTV Football
 SiTV Five Star Sports
 SiTV Jazz Pop
 SiTV Magnificent Classical
 SiTV Chinese Music
 SiTV Easy Beats
 SiTV English Speaker Drama
 SiTV Enjoyable Classical
 SiTV Chinese Best
 SiTV Western Best
 SiTV Japan and Korea Best
 SiTV M-Zone
 SiTV Origin of Chinese
 SiTV Martial Arts World
 SiTV Food Heaven
 SiTV Toy Puzzle
 SiTV Lifestyle
 SiTV Channel Young
 SiTV Cultural Treasures
 SiTV HD
 SiTV Finance

Shanxi
 Shanxi Television (SXTV) 山西电视台
 Shanxi Satellite Channel
 Shanxi Economic Channel
 Shanxi Science and Education Channel
 Shanxi Movie Channel
 Shanxi Public Channel
 Taiyuan Television (TYTV) 太原电视台
 Taiyuan News Channel
 Taiyuan People's Channel
 Taiyuan Law Channel
 Taiyuan Movie Channel
 Taiyuan Sports Channel
 Taiyuan Education Channel
 Jincheng Television (SXJCTV) 晋城电视台
 Jincheng News Channel
 Jincheng Public Channel
 Jincheng Documentary Channel
 Jinzhong Television (JZTV) 晋中电视台
 Jinzhong News Channel
 Jinzhong Economic Channel
 Linfen Television (LFTV) 临汾电视台
 Linfen Television 1
 Linfen Television 2
 Linfen Television 3
 Yellow River Television (CYRTV) 黄河电视台
 Yellow River Star Channel
 Yellow River International Channel
 Datong Television (DTTV) 大同电视台
 Datong Comprehensive News Channel
 Datong Movie Channel
 Datong Lifestyle Channel
 Datong Education Channel
 Changzhi Television (CZTV) 长治电视台
 Changzhi Comprehensive News Channel
 Changzhi Public Channel
 Changzhi Education Channel
 Yangquan Television (YQTV) 阳泉电视台
 Yangquan Comprehensive News Channel
 Yangquan Television 2
 Yangquan Television 3
 Yangquan Coal Company Channel
 Yangquan Documentary Channel

Sichuan
 Sichuan Television (SCTV) 四川电视台
 Sichuan Satellite Channel
 Sichuan News Channel
 Sichuan Culture and Tourism TV Channel
 Sichuan Economic Channel
 Sichuan Movie and Drama Channel
 Sichuan Shopping Channel
 Sichuan Women's and Children's Channel
 Sichuan Public Channel
 Sichuan Emei Movie Channel
 Chengdu Television (CDTV) 成都电视台
 Chengdu Comprehensive News Channel
 Chengdu Economic Info Channel
 Chengdu City and Lifestyle Channel
 Chengdu Movie and Drama Channel
 Chengdu Public Channel
 Chengdu Children Channel
 Tianfu Food Channel
 Deyang Television (DYTV) 德阳电视台
 Deyang News Channel
 Deyang Public Channel
 Deyang City Channel
 Deyang Interactive Channel
 Liangshan Television (LSTV) 凉山电视台
 Liangshan Comprehensive News Channel
 Liangshan Public Channel
 Nanchong Television (NCTV) 南充电视台
 Nanchong News Channel
 Nanchong Public Channel
 Nanchong Science And Education Channel
 Nanchong Information Channel
 Nanchong Entertainment Channel
 Luzhou Television (SCLZTV) 泸州电视台
 Luzhou Television Channel

Tianjin
 Tianjin Television (TJTV) 天津电视台
 Tianjin Satellite Channel
 Tianjin Coastal Channel
 Tianjin Art Channel
 Tianjin Science and Education Channel
 Tianjin Drama Channel
 Tianjin Sports Channel
 Tianjin City Channel
 Tianjin Children's Channel
 Tianjin Public Channel

Tibet
 Tibet Television (TXZTV) 西藏电视台
 Tibet Satellite Channel
 Tibet Movie and Culture Channel
 Lhasa Television (LSTV) 拉萨电视台
 Lhasa Television Channel

Xinjiang
 Xinjiang Television (XJTV) 新疆电视台
 Xinjiang Chinese Comprehensive News Channel(Satellite Channel)
 Xinjiang Uyghur Comprehensive News Channel(Satellite Channel)
 Xinjiang Kazakh Comprehensive News Channel(Satellite Channel)
 Xinjiang Chinese Arts Channel(Satellite Channel)
 Xinjiang Uyghur Arts Channel(Satellite Channel)
 Xinjiang Chinese Drama Channel
 Xinjiang Chinese Economic Channel
 Xinjiang Kazakh Arts Channel(Satellite Channel)
 Xinjiang Uyghur Economic Channel(Satellite Channel)
 Xinjiang Chinese Sports and Health Channel(Satellite Channel)
 Xinjiang Chinese Law Info Channel
 Xinjiang Children's Channel(In Chinese, Uyghur, Kazakh and Kyrgyz, Satellite Channel)
 Xinjiang Education Channel
 Ürümqi Television (UTV) 乌鲁木齐电视台
 Ürümqi Chinese News Channel
 Ürümqi Uyghur News Channel
 Ürümqi Movie Channel
 Ürümqi City Channel
 Ürümqi Travel Channel
 Ürümqi Women's Channel
 Kashgar Television (KTV) 喀什地区电视台
 Kashgar Uyghur Comprehensive Channel
 Kashgar Chinese Comprehensive Channel
 Kashgar Tech & Education Channel
 Altay Television (ATV) 阿勒泰地区电视台
 Altay Chinese Comprehensive Channel (漢語綜合頻道)
 Altay Chinese Urban lifestyle Channel (漢語城市生活頻道)
 Altay Kazakh Comprehensive Channel (哈薩克語綜合頻道)
 Xinjiang Production and Construction Corps Television (XPCCTV)新疆生产建设兵团电视台
 Corps Television

Yunnan
 Yunnan Television (YNTV) 云南电视台
 Yunnan Satellite Channel
 Yunnan Television 2
 Yunnan Television 3
 Yunnan Television 4
 Yunnan Television 5
 Yunnan Television 6
 Kunming Television (KMTV) 昆明电视台
 Kunming Comprehensive News Channel
 Kunming Lifestyle Channel
 Kunming Entertainment Channel
 Kunming Economic Channel
 Kunming Movie Channel
 Kunming Public Channel
 Xishuangbanna Television (XSBNTV) 西双版纳电视台
 Xishuangbanna Television 1
 Xishuangbanna Television 2
 Yuxi Television (YXTV) 玉溪电视台
 Yuxi Television Channel
 Kunming Educational Television (KETV) 昆明教育电视台
 Kunming Educational Channel
 Lijiang Television (LJTV) 丽江电视台
 Lijiang Comprehensive News Channel
 Lijiang Public Channel

Zhejiang
 Zhejiang Television (ZJTV) 浙江电视台
 Zhejiang Satellite Channel
 Zhejiang Qianjiang City Channel
 Zhejiang Leisure Channel
 Zhejiang Politics Channel
 Zhejiang Educational and Technology Channel
 Zhejiang Entertainment Channel
 Zhejiang Public and New Rural Channel
 Zhejiang Children's Channel
 Zhejiang International Channel
 Zhenhai Television (ZJZHTV) 镇海电视台
 Zhenhai Television Channel
 Zhoushan Television (ZSTV) 舟山电视台
 Zhoushan News Channel
 Zhoushan Economic Channel
 Zhoushan Entertainment Channel
 Jinhua Television (JHTV) 金华电视台
 Jinhua Comprehensive News Channel
 Jinhua Educational and Technology Channel
 Jinhua Economic Channel
 Jiaxing Television (JXTV) 嘉兴电视台
 Jiaxing Comprehensive News Channel
 Jiaxing Cultural and Drama Channel
 Jiaxing Public Channel
 Ningbo Television (NBTV) 宁波电视台
 Ningbo Comprehensive News Channel
 Ningbo Social Life Channel
 Ningbo Cultural and Entertainment Channel
 Ningbo Movie and Drama Channel
 Ningbo Children's Channel
 Wenzhou Television (ZJWZTV) 温州电视台
 Wenzhou Comprehensive News Channel
 Wenzhou Economic, Science and Education Channel
 Wenzhou City and Lifestyle Channel
 Wenzhou Entertainment Channel
 Hangzhou Television (HZTV) 杭州电视台
 Hangzhou Children's Channel
 Hangzhou Comprehensive News Channel
 Hangzhou West Lake Pearl Channel
 Hangzhou Lifestyle Channel
 Hangzhou Movie Channel
 Hangzhou Drama Channel
 Shaoxing Television (ZJSXTV) 绍兴电视台
 Shaoxing Public Channel
 Shaoxing Comprehensive News Channel
 Shaoxing Movie Channel
 Yiwu Television (YWTV) 义乌电视台
 Yiwu News Channel
 Yiwu Business Channel
 Yiwu Drama Channel

Hong Kong

Free-to-air networks
 Television Broadcasts Limited (TVB) 無綫電視
 TVB Jade
 TVB Pearl (Selected program in Cantonese dubbed & the following program in Putonghua)
 TVB J2
 TVB News Channel
 TVB Finance, Sports & Information Channel
 Radio Television Hong Kong (RTHK) 香港電台
 RTHK 31
 RTHK 32
 RTHK 33
 RTHK 34
 HK Television Entertainment Company Limited 香港電視娛樂
 ViuTVsix (Selected program in Cantonese dubbed & the following program in Putonghua)
 ViuTV
 Fantastic Television Limited 奇妙電視
 HOY TV Channel 77
 Hong Kong International Business Channel 76
 HOY Infotainment Channel 78

Cable networks
 Cable TV Hong Kong (HKCTV) 香港有線電視
 i-CABLE Weather
 i-CABLE Top News
 i-CABLE Finance Info
 i-CABLE News
 i-CABLE Live News

Premium networks
 Dim Sum Television (DSTV) 點心衛視
 Dim Sum Channel
 Chinese Entertainment Television (CETV) 華娛衛視
 CETV Channel
 Phoenix Television 鳳凰衛視
 Phoenix Chinese Channel
 Phoenix Movies Channel
 Phoenix InfoNews Channel
 Phoenix Hong Kong Channel
 STAR TV (STAR) 星空傳媒
 STAR Chinese Channel
 STAR Chinese Movies
 National Geographic Channel
 Sun Television (SUN) 陽光衛視
 SUN Channel

Broadband networks
 now TV (now) Now 寬頻電視
 Now TV channel
 Now TV Satellite Channel
 Now Sports HD
 Now News Channel
 Now Business News Channel
 Now Hong Kong
 Now Shop
 Now Game
 Now Sports 1
 Now Sports 2
 Now Sports 3
 Now Sports 4
 Now Sports 5
 Now Sports 6
 Now Sports 7
 myTV SUPER
 TVB Entertainment News
 TVBN2
 TVB Japanese Drama
 TVB Korean Drama
 TVB Chinese Drama
 TVB Classic
 TVB Classic Movies
 TVB Asian Variety
 TVB Asian Select
 TVB Food
 TVB Sport
 Jade Catch Up
 TVB Radio
 TVB Travel
 TVB Chinese Opera Channel
 Hong Kong Broadband Network (HKBN) 香港寬頻網絡有限公司
 bbTV (香港寬頻)

Other networks
 Health & Lifestyle Channel (HLC) 健康生活台
 Health & Lifestyle Channel
 Creation Television 創世電視
 Creation TV Channel
 Mei Ah Entertainment 美亞娛樂
 Mei Ah Channel
 Mei Ah Movie
 Mei Ah Drama
 Celestial Movies 天映頻道
 Celestial Movies Channel
 Taoist Television 道通天地
 Taoist Television Channel
 Digital Outdoor Television (DOTV) 數碼户外電視
 DOTV Channel
 Hotmedia
 McDonald's Channel

Mobile networks
 RoadShow 路訊通
 RoadShow Channel
 Newsline Express 新聞直線
 Newsline Express Channel
 i-TAXI
 i-TAXI Channel
 Motionpower
 Motionpower Channel

Macau 

 Teledifusão de Macau (TDM) 澳廣視
 TDM Ou Mun 澳視澳門台
 Canal Macau 澳視葡文
 TDM Desporto 澳視體育台
 TDM Informação 澳視澳門資訊台
 TDM Entretenimento 澳視澳門綜藝台
 TDM-Macau Satéllite 澳門衛視
 Macau Asia Satellite Television (MASTV) 澳亞衛視
 MASTV Channel
 Lotus Television (LTV) 澳門蓮花衞視
 Lotus TV Macau
 Fung Fu Television (FFTV) 功夫衛視
 Fung Fu TV Channel
 China Satellite Television (CSTV) 中華衛視
 CSTV Channel

Taiwan

Free-to-air networks 
 Taiwan Television (TTV) 台灣電視
 TTV Channel
 TTV Family
 TTV Finance
 TTV Health
 TTV World
 China Television (CTV) 中國電視
 CTV Channel
 CTV News Channel
 CTV MyLife
 Formosa Television
 Formosa Television (FTV) 民視電視
 FTV News
 Follow Me TV
 Taiwan Broadcasting System (TBS) 台灣公共廣播電視集團
 Chinese Television System (CTS) 中華電視
 CTS Channel
 CTS Education and Culture
 CTS Recreation
 CTS News
 Public Television Service (PTS) 公共電視
 PTS TV3 Channel
 Dimo TV
 HiHD

Other networks 
 Taiwan Broadcasting System (TBS) 台灣公共廣播電視集團
 Hakka Television 客家電視
 Taiwan Indigenous Television 原住民族電視
 Taiwan Macroview Television 台灣宏觀電視

Premium networks 
 Beautiful Life Television (BLTV) 人間衛視
 Beautiful Life Television Channel
 DaAi Television (DaAiTV) 大愛衛星電視
 DaAi Television 1
 DaAi Television 2
 EPili Network 霹靂台灣台
 PiliTV
 GOOD TV (GOOD) 好消息衛星電視台
 GOOD TV 1
 GOOD TV 2
 Momo Shopping Television (MOMO) MOMO購物台
 MOMO Kids
 MOMO Shopping Television 1
 MOMO Shopping Television 2
 MOMO Shopping Television 3
 Gala Television (GTV) 八大電視
 GTV One
 GTV Variety Show
 GTV Drama
 GTV K Channel
 Sanlih E-Television (SET) 三立電視
 SET International
 SET Taiwan
 SET News
 SET Metro
 STAR TV (STAR) 星空傳媒
 STAR Chinese Channel
 STAR Chinese Movies
 STAR Movies
 National Geographic Channel
 STAR World
 Eastern Television (ETTV) 東森電視
 ETTV Variety
 ETTV News
 EBC Financial News
 ETTV Drama
 ETTV Movie
 ETTV Foreign Movie
 ETTV Shopping 1
 ETTV Shopping 2
 ETTV Shopping 3
 ETTV Shopping 4
 ETTV Shopping 5
 ETTV Yoyo
 ETTV America
 ETTV Asia
 ETTV China
 ETTV Global
 ET Today

 Get Television (GT) 高點電視
 Get Varsity
 Get Leisure
 Japan Entertainment Television (JET TV) JET綜合
 JET TV
 JET TV International
 Era Television (Era) 年代電視
 Era News
 Era Varsity
 Much TV
 Azio TV
 Azio TV Asia
 Chung T'ien Television (CTi)
 CTi Variety
 CTi News
 CTi Entertainment
 CTi International
 CTi Satellite Channel
 TVBS 無線衛星電視台
 TVBS Channel
 TVBS Joy Channel
 TVBS-NEWS
 TVBS-Asia
 Unique Business News (UBN) 非凡電視
 UBN News
 UBN Business
 VIVA Shopping (VIVA) VIVA購物頻道
 VIVA Shopping Channel
 Hollywood Movie 好萊塢電影
 Hollywood Movie Channel
 Videoland Television Network (VTN) 緯來電視網
 Videoland Japan
 Videoland Sports
 Videoland Movie
 Videoland General Entertainment Channel (On-TV)
 Videoland Drama
 Videoland Max-TV
 LS Time TV
 Gold Sun Television (GSTV) 國興衛視
 GSTV Channel
 SBN Global Finance (SBN)
 SBN Global Finance Channel
 CSTV 華人商業
 CSTV Drama
 CSTV Afa
 CSTV Travel Asia
 Hang Seng Finance (HSF) 恆生財經
 Hang Seng Finance Channel
 Universal Culture Television (UCTV) 法界衛星
 UCTV Channel
 Buddha Compassion Television Station (BTS) 佛衛電視慈悲台
 BTS Channel
 5888 Media Financial Network 5888影音理財網
 5888MFN Channel
 Hwazan-World Television 華藏世界衛視
 Hwazan Satellite Television
 World Television
 Z Television
 Z Channel
 Z2 Channel
 Network Broadcasting Television (NBTV) 生命電視
 NBTV
 TACT Television (TACT) 台灣藝術
 TACT TV Channel
 Finance Television 財訊財經
 FinanceTV Channel
 No.i 冠軍電視
 No.i Channel
 noi Television (noiTV) 運通財經
 noiTV Channel
 CSTV 中華財經
 CSTV Channel

Malaysia 
 8TV
 Astro Wah Lai Toi On Demand
 Astro Quan Jia HD
 iQIYI HD
 Astro AEC HD
 Astro Hua Hee Dai HD
 Astro Xiao Tai Yang HD
 Astro AOD (TVB dramas aired simultaneously with Hong Kong TVB main in HD)
 Astro Shuang Xing HD
 Astro Go Shop Mandarin HD
 TVB Jade HD

Singapore 
Mediacorp Channel U HD
Mediacorp Channel 8 HD
Hub Drama First
Hub VV Drama
E City
Jia Le Channel

Other Asian countries 

Most of the television channels in Indonesia show foreign content with no dubbing, including Chinese language programs.

Australia

New Zealand 
CTV1
CTV2
CTV3
CTV4 (Phoenix TV Chinese Channel)
CTV5
CTV6 (CCTV-4)
CTV7
CTV8 (Free-To-Air Auckland UHF Channel 62)

United States

Subscription networks
Asia Television (ATV Home channel)
Phoenix Television
Television Broadcasts Limited (TVB USA) Jadeworld East, Jadeworld West, San Francisco, Los Angeles channels

Los Angeles free-to-air networks
 KVMD - Channel 31
 GDTV - 31.4 广东电视台
 Creation TV - 31.5 創世電視
 TBWTV - 31.7 世界電視
 WCETV - 31.8 銀視數碼台
 KMEX - Channel 34
 超视台 - 34.5 超視美洲頻道
 KXLA - Channel 44
 SinoTV - 44.2 華語電視
 Sky Link TV - 44.3 天下衛視 國語
 Sky Link TV - 44.4 天下衛視 粵語
 International Audio-Visual Communication - 44.6  國際衛視(IAVC)
 New Tang Dynasty Television - 44.7  新唐人电視 (NTDTV)
 International Chinese Network - 44.8  国际中国电视联播网 (ICN)
 G&E Television - G & E Studio - 44.9 環球東方 (GETV) 
 KJLA - Channel 57
 Zhong Want TV - 57.9  中旺電視(ZWTV)

New York City free-to-air networks
 WMBC-TV - Channel 63
 SinoVision - 63.3 美国中文电视
 New Tang Dynasty Television - 63.5 新唐人电視 (NTDTV)

San Francisco free-to-air networks
KAXT - Channel 1
 Creation TV - 1.8 美國創世電視 
 Uchannel - 1.9 優視頻道 
KRON - Channel 4
 Sky Link TV - 4.2 天下衛視
KTSF - Channel 26
 KTSF Channel - 26 KTSF
 International Audio-Visual Communication - 26.4  國際衛視 (IAVC)
KMTP-TV - Channel 32
 New Tang Dynasty Television - 32.5 新唐人电視 (NTDTV)
KICU - Channel 36
 WCETV - 36.3 CCTV NEWS 
KCNS-TV - Channel 38
 SinoTV - 38.2 华语电视 (SinoTV)
 Other/iPad
 TVHS 1.9 - 北美宏星衛視 1.9

Sacramento free-to-air networks
KBTV-CD - Channel 8
 Crossings TV (12:00-2:30pm and 9:50-11:30pm Mon-Fri; Sat; 0:00-11:30pm 12:00-3:00pm and 10:00-11:30pm Sun)

Other
Voice of America Chinese Branch
Global Dragon TV 环球龙视 - Washington DC, Northern VA and Maryland,
Airs on Cox Cable 30 and channel 19

Canada

Europe
TVBS-Europe-5 channels based in the United Kingdom and broadcasting to 48 countries in Europe.
Chinese Radio and TV based in Netherlands

See also 
 Lists of television channels

References

 
Chinese language television channels
Mass media in China